John Alexander Marenbon, FBA (born 26 August 1955) is a British philosopher and Fellow of Trinity College, Cambridge. His principal area of specialization is medieval philosophy.

Career
He obtained BA, MA, PhD, and DLitt degrees from the University of Cambridge. Since 1978 he has been a Fellow of Trinity College, Cambridge, and a  senior research fellow there since 2005. In 2010 he became an honorary professor of medieval philosophy at Cambridge, delivering an inaugural lecture entitled 'When was medieval philosophy?'. He has also taught at Paris-Sorbonne University, been a visiting fellow at both the Centre for Medieval Studies and the Pontifical Institute of Mediaeval Studies at the University of Toronto, and held a visiting appointment at Peking University.

He was elected a Fellow of the British Academy in 2009.

Since 2020 Marenbon has been a visiting professor at the University of Italian Switzerland.

Selected bibliography

Authored books

 Medieval Philosophy : an historical and philosophical Introduction, London and New York; Routledge, 2007
 The Cambridge Companion to Boethius (ed.), Cambridge; Cambridge University Press, 2009
 The Oxford Handbook of Medieval Philosophy (editor), New York; Oxford University Press 2012
  The Hellenistic Schools and Thinking about Pagan Philosophy in the Middle Ages. A study of second-order influence [booklet], Basel; Schwabe, 2012
 Continuity and Innovation in Medieval and Modern Philosophy. Knowledge, mind, and language (editor), Oxford: Oxford University Press for the British Academy, 2013 = Proceedings of the British Academy 189
 Abelard in Four Dimensions. A twelfth-century philosopher in his context and ours, Notre Dame: University of Notre Dame Press, 2013
 Pagans and Philosophers. The problem of paganism from Augustine to Leibniz, Princeton and Woodbridge; Princeton University Press 2015

References

External links
Academia page

Living people
Fellows of Trinity College, Cambridge
Academic staff of Paris-Sorbonne University
Academic staff of the University of Toronto
Academic staff of Peking University
20th-century British philosophers
21st-century British philosophers
1955 births
Alumni of Trinity College, Cambridge
Fellows of the British Academy
British medievalists
Spouses of life peers
Scholars of medieval philosophy